Inger is an unincorporated community and census-designated place (CDP) in Itasca County, Minnesota, United States, along the Bowstring River of the Leech Lake Indian Reservation. As of the 2010 census, its population was 212.

The center of Inger is generally considered as being at the junction of Itasca County Roads 35 and 146. State Highway 46 (MN 46) is also in the vicinity. Inger is located 22 miles northwest of Deer River.

In Ojibwe, the community is called Chi-achaabaaning, meaning "by the Big Bowstring" due to its location along the Bowstring River.  The village is located in the former Inger Township, which reverted to being unorganized.  Named for one of its pioneer settlers, a post office was in operation from 1912 until 1955.

Located nine miles south of Inger is the Winnibigoshish Lake Dam, which is listed on the National Register of Historic Places.

Demographics

References 

 Rand McNally Road Atlas – 2007 edition – Minnesota entry
 Official State of Minnesota Highway Map – 2011/2012 edition
 Mn/DOT map of Itasca County – Sheet 2 – 2011 edition

Census-designated places in Minnesota
Census-designated places in Itasca County, Minnesota